The term boom operator may refer to:

 Boom operator (military), a member of the crew aboard an aerial refueling tanker, responsible for "flying the boom"
 Boom operator (media), a member of the crew of a film or radio project, responsible for operating a microphone and sound boom

See also
 Operator (profession)